Acianthera rostellata is a species of orchid.

rostellata